The peripheral odontogenic fibroma is an uncommon gingival mass.  It affects people across a large age range.  It can be confused with the peripheral ossifying fibroma.  In contrast to the peripheral ossifying fibroma, the peripheral odontogenic fibroma is a rare lesion.

No specific gender predilection while the ages of the patients ranged from 5 to 65 years.commonly seen in mandible than maxilla.
slow growing, solid, firmly attached gingival mass sometimes arising between teeth and sometimes displacing teeth.
consists of cellular fibrous connective tissue parenchyma with non neoplastic islands, strands of clouman or cuboidal odontogenic epithelium.

References
Kahn, Michael A. Basic Oral and Maxillofacial Pathology. Volume 1. 2001.

Periodontal disorders